Diesel locomotives built by the Baldwin Locomotive Works:

Switchers

Road switchers

Transfer units

Cab units

See also
 Beep (SWBLW): a VO-1000 rebuilt by the Atchison, Topeka and Santa Fe Railway in 1970.

References

 
 
 
 
 
 
 
 
 

Baldwin diesel locomotives